Honduras competed at the 2004 Summer Olympics in Athens, Greece, from 13 to 29 August 2004.

Athletics 

Honduran athletes have so far achieved qualifying standards in the following athletics events (up to a maximum of 3 athletes in each event at the 'A' Standard, and 1 at the 'B' Standard).

Men
Track & road events

Judo

Swimming 

Men

Women

Table tennis

Honduras sent a table tennis player to Athens through a tripartite invitation.

See also
 Honduras at the 2003 Pan American Games
 Honduras at the 2004 Summer Paralympics

References

External links
Official Report of the XXVIII Olympiad

Nations at the 2004 Summer Olympics
2004
Olympics